The Nampally metro station is located on the Red Line of the Hyderabad Metro. Nampally Metro station will be connected with Nampally railway station 200 mts away with a covered walkway and railing.

History 
It was opened on 24 September 2018.

Facilities 
Nampally metro station will be connected to Moazzam Jahi Market. A state of-the-art automated multi-level parking complex called ‘Novum’, spread over 15 floors and a total area of 2,000 sq metre is being built near Nampally Metro station.

References

Hyderabad Metro stations